The Moncton City Council is the governing body of the City of Moncton, New Brunswick, Canada. It consists of a mayor and ten councillors elected to four-year terms. The council is non-partisan with the mayor serving as the chairman, casting a ballot only in cases of a tie vote. There are four wards electing two councillors each with an additional two councillors selected at-large by the general electorate. Day-to-day operation of the city is under the control of a city manager.

City council members (2021–present) 

Elected May 11, 2021:
Mayor: Dawn Arnold
Monique LeBlanc (at-large)
Marty Kingston (at-large)
Shawn Crossman (Ward 1)
Paulette Thériault (Ward 1)
Daniel Bourgeois (Ward 2)
Charles Léger (Ward 2)
Bryan Butler (Ward 3)
Dave Steeves (Ward 3)
Paul Richard (Ward 4)
Susan F. Edgett (Ward 4)

City council members (2016–2021) 

Elected May 10, 2016:
Mayor: Dawn Arnold
Vacant Seat (at-large) (Due to Greg Turner being elected to the Legislative Assembly of New Brunswick.)
Pierre Boudreau (at-large)
Shawn Crossman (Ward 1)
Paulette Thériault (Ward 1)
Blair Lawrence (Ward 2)
Charles Leger (Ward 2)
Bryan Butler (Ward 3)
Brian Hicks (Ward 3. Elected 2018 to replace Rob McKee, who was elected to the Legislative Assembly of New Brunswick.)
Paul A. Pellerin (Ward 4)
Susan F. Edgett (Ward 4. Elected November 15, 2016, to replace René Landry, who died August 2, 2016.)

References

Municipal councils in New Brunswick
Politics of Moncton